Lasseter's Last Ride is an Australian book by Ion Idriess.

It was his first best seller. There were five different editions of it. It tells the story of Harold Bell Lasseter and Lasseter's Reef.

References

1931 non-fiction books
English-language books
Books by Ion Idriess
Australian biographies
Angus & Robertson books